Mick Audsley (born 11 January 1949 in London, England) is a British film and television editor with more than thirty film credits. He is a frequent collaborator of directors Mike Newell and Stephen Frears, having edited 15 films for Frears.

Life and career
Audsley was educated at Sevenoaks School, a boarding independent school in the town of Sevenoaks in Kent, in South East England. He then attended Hornsey College of Art and the Royal College of Art where he worked as a sound and then picture editor on various projects for the BFI Production Board. Audsley is married to fellow editor Joke van Wijk, together they have two children.

Audsley has had a notable collaboration with the director Stephen Frears from 1982 to present. In 1988, Audsley was nominated for the BAFTA Award for Best Editing for Dangerous Liaisons, and the BAFTA TV Award for The Snapper both of which were directed by Frears. Audsley also has had a comparably extended collaboration with director Mike Newell editing for films such as Harry Potter and the Goblet of Fire, Love in the Time of Cholera and Prince of Persia: The Sands of Time.

Filmography

Further reading

References

External links
 
 

British film editors
1949 births
Living people
People educated at Sevenoaks School
Film people from London